First Mile is a UK environmental and waste management business based in London. It works with businesses to reduce their climate impact through services such as waste, recycling, and renewable energy.

History
First Mile was founded in 2004 by Bruce Bratley in Islington, North London. In the early days, trucks were parked near Bruce's house and he would often drive them himself to complete weekend collections.

The name is an inversion of the “Last Mile” concept associated with the last leg of telecommunications delivery. “First Mile" focuses on the first leg of recycling, collecting it from the end user in as convenient a way as possible, and delivering to local recycling facilities.

The company has acquired multiple businesses including part of Cory Environmental, Revolution Recycling, All Clear, Paperchasers Birmingham, and Giraffe Recycling. 

In 2015 the head office moved from Essex Road railway station to the workspace Screenworks in Islington, North London. The main depot is located in Park Royal, northwest of the city. The company also has another office and depot in Birmingham.

The company today serves over 27,000 businesses across the UK.

In 2020, during the Coronavirus pandemic, First Mile provided it's vans to deliver goods to hospitals, charities, and to support a plant start-up to deliver plants destined for waste to UK homes.

Acquisitions 
First Mile has acquired a number of other environmental businesses;

- Cory Environmental's London waste collection business in 2012

- Revolution Recycling in 2014

- All Clear Recycling in 2013

- Giraffe Recycling in 2020

Technology and innovation 
By 2017, First Mile had over 10,000 clients. It has attracted investments from private equity company Growth Capital Partners. Zero emissions electric vans and cargo bikes were also introduced in 2017. Today, the entire fleet of over 70 vehicles is either zero or low-emissions, and the company was ready for ULEZ ahead of its implementation in April 2019.

In 2018 the construction of the pre-sorting facility named the Sacktory was completed. Located at the depot in Park Royal, the Sacktory ensures a higher recycling rate by separating mixed recycling materials from general waste. An average of 100 tonnes of waste is processed at the facility every day. In its first year of operations, the Sacktory has prevented 250 tonnes of  emissions and helped First Mile reach the Mayor's 65% recycling target for London.

The company continues to invest in recycling strategies. It is currently developing its RecycleLab, which will be completed in 2019. The RecycleLab analyses non-traditional materials to find recycling or sustainable end-of-life solutions. It also aims to help brands design products that can remain in the circular economy, following the waste management hierarchy developed by the Waste Framework Directive (WFD).

References

External links 

 

Waste management companies of the United Kingdom
Recycling organizations